The short-toed rock thrush (Monticola brevipes) is a species of bird in the family Muscicapidae. It is found in Angola, Botswana, Namibia, and South Africa. Its natural habitat is subtropical or tropical dry shrubland.

Birds in the eastern part of its range are sometimes regarded as a separate species, the Pretoria rock thrush or Transvaal rock thrush (M. pretoriae).

References

External links
 Short-toed rock thrush - Species text in The Atlas of Southern African Birds.

short-toed rock thrush
Birds of Southern Africa
short-toed rock thrush
Taxonomy articles created by Polbot